John Edward Ahern (February 6, 1897 – April 4, 1969) was a Canadian politician. He represented the electoral district of Halifax North in the Nova Scotia House of Assembly from 1956 to 1963. He was a member of the Nova Scotia Liberal Party.

Born in 1897 in Halifax, Nova Scotia, Ahern was educated at Saint Mary's University and Dalhousie Law School. He married Ellen Bourke in 1927. An active participant and promoter of sport in Nova Scotia, Ahern was posthumously inducted into the Nova Scotia Sport Hall of Fame in 1982.

Ahern was an alderman in Halifax from 1941 to 1946, serving as deputy mayor from 1943 to 1946. He served as mayor of Halifax from 1946 to 1949, and returned as an alderman from 1952 to 1956. He entered provincial politics in the 1956 election, winning the Halifax North riding. He was re-elected in 1960. In the 1963 election, Ahern was defeated by Progressive Conservative James H. Vaughan. Ahern died at Halifax on April 4, 1969.

References

1897 births
1969 deaths
Mayors of places in Nova Scotia
Nova Scotia Liberal Party MLAs
Schulich School of Law alumni
Saint Mary's University (Halifax) alumni